Ouled Moumen is a town and commune in Souk Ahras Province in north-eastern Algeria. The commune occupies the ancient Roman and Carthaginian town of Civitas Popthensis, a town that had an estimated 10,000 to 12,000 inhabitants during the roman Principate period.

References

Communes of Souk Ahras Province
Cities in Algeria
Algeria